James Mosman or Mossman (died 1573) was a Scottish goldsmith. He and his son John Mosman were supporters of the cause of Mary, Queen of Scots. James Mosman was executed in 1573 for counterfeiting coins in Edinburgh Castle. John Mosman carried letters for Mary, Queen of Scots, and was under surveillance by Francis Walsingham.

Career
He was a son of John Mosman, a goldsmith working in Edinburgh. He married Mariota Arres, and secondly in 1571, Janet King. Mosman and Arres rebuilt the John Knox House on the High Street in Edinburgh. Moubray House is adjacent to the west.

Mosman and Arres were given permission in May 1557 by Mary of Guise to extend the cellars of another house they owned under the High Street. This house was on the south side of the Royal Mile between houses belonging to Alan Dickson and Richard Hoppar.

On 16 December 1558 Mosman weighed and valued the treasures of St Giles' Kirk including the reliquary of Saint Giles' arm bone.

James Mosman and his workshop made gold chains for Mary, Queen of Scots to give as diplomatic gifts.

In April 1566 he sold the queen rings and other pieces which were probably intended as presents to her attendants.

He was an assay master in the Scottish mint and made dies for the coinage. Other mint officers included, David Forrest, General of the coin house, Andrew Henderson, warden, John Balfour, comptroller warden, and James Gray, sinker or maker of dies. Grey was another goldsmith, he sold pearls to Mary and refashioned and mended a basin and laver for her.

In 1567 he was converting a piece of Mary, Queen of Scots' jewelry when she was imprisoned in Lochleven Castle. Mosman gave this chain set with little diamonds, which he was making into a hairband garnishing, to Robert Melville, and his brother Andrew Melville of Garvock took it to the captive queen.

Mariota Arres died in 1571, and soon after James Mosman married Janet King. She was a daughter of Alexander King, an Edinburgh advocate.

James Mosman remained loyal to Mary when she was exiled in England. Mosman worked in Edinburgh Castle with James Cockie making coins for Mary's supporters who held the castle during the 'Lang Siege'. The two goldsmiths valued the jewels of Mary, Queen of Scots which remained in the castle, so they could be used as security for loans.

With another goldsmith James Cockie, he helped raise money on the security of the jewels of Mary, Queen of Scots during the "lang siege" of Edinburgh castle. They set up a mint in the castle to coin silver. Mosman and Cockie were executed in 1573 at the end of the siege, following a trial at the Palace of Holyroodhouse.

Mosman, William Kirkcaldy, his brother James Kirkcaldy and James Cockie, were hanged on 3 August 1573.

John Mosman and Walsingham
His son John Mosman, Janet King, and James Cockie's children were given pacifications by the Parliament of Scotland in October 1581. John Mosman was sometimes known as "John Mosman younger" to distinguish him from his uncle, who was an established Edinburgh goldsmith. He carried a letter to John Lauder at Sheffield, a member of Queen Mary's household, from his father James Lauder, a court musician, in October 1582. He also wrote to John Lauder from London, asking him to reply and tell him if Queen Mary was not planning to benefit him. In November he wrote to Mary asking for a reward as the son of her "grace's master coiner and true subject", enough to start a trade and support his brothers and sisters. He had previously sent her an account of outstanding sums she owed his father. He had spent four months in London waiting for a reply from her and spent all his money.

John Mosman was interviewed in London by the Scottish poet and spy William Fowler, who found him plain and simple and fit only for carrying letters. He became involved with the correspondence of the French ambassador Michel de Castelnau and was monitored by Francis Walsingham. Despite Fowler's judgement of his skills, Walsingham intercepted a number of letters in March 1583 which referred to Mosman's verbal reports, and he wished that he had been arrested as a "bad instrument". Fowler advised Walsingham that Mosman could be caught with letters of Mary, Queen of Scots and the French diplomat La Mothe Fénelon in a ship at Gravesend.

The English ambassador in Scotland, Robert Bowes wrote to Walsingham in June 1583 that John Mosman was ready to go by "privily by land to London, with good store of letters" for Michel de Castelnau. Mosman knew that Bowes was watching him. Coded letters mentioning Mary's intention to reward John Mosman with 100 Écu were discovered in the Bibliothèque nationale de France and deciphered in 2023.

References

Further reading
 Charles John Guthrie, John Knox and his House, 2nd Edition (Edinburgh, 1905)
 John Knox House: Edinburgh World Heritage Trust
 Gold Buttons: blog describing Mosman's role during the 'Lang Siege

Scottish goldsmiths
Businesspeople from Edinburgh
1573 deaths
Mosman family
Executed Scottish people
People executed by the Kingdom of Scotland by hanging